Air Commodore Jonah David Jang (Rtd) CON (born 13 March 1944) is a Nigerian statesman who was the Governor of Plateau State from 2007 to 2015. He had previously served as Military Governor of Benue State and Gongola State
He ran successfully for re-election on 26 April 2011. In 2015, Jang ran and won Plateau North senate seat as his term as Governor of Plateau State drew to a close. In 2018 Jang declared his senate seat vacant and said it was time for the people of Plateau North to decide who would represent them at the red chamber. Jang was at the time making a nocturnal political consultations to run for the presidential ticket of the main opposition, PDP for the 2019 presidential election.

He was a founding member of the Peoples' Democratic Party in the days that preceded the second military to civilian transfer of power in 1999 ushering the Nigerian Fourth Republic.

In the new millennium democratic dispensation for which Jang had so much fought to wrest power from the military, he made an unsuccessful run for the governorship of Plateau State in an election which was marred by alleged forms of irregularities and malpractices on the platform of the All Nigeria Peoples Party. Initially, he had sought the PDP governorship nomination prior in 1999 but lost after which he decamped to the opposition ANPP to make yet another run for governorship again.

Jang is a native Berom and is a proponent of massive infrastructural development. During his tenure as Governor of Plateau State, some of his achievements included: road construction through the length and breadth of the state, rehabilitation of public water supply, agricultural partnership program between the state and Israeli experts (ASTC) and in environmental sanitation to mention a few. As Governor, Jang embarked on a thorough purge of the Plateau State Civil Service ridding it of unwanted corrupt elements mostly in the form of ghost workers. He is regarded by many as having recorded achievements comparable only to those of the very first Governor of the state, Police Commissioner Joseph Gomwalk.
He has a lot of experience in military and security matters which owes to his prudent management of the Tiv/Jukun crisis during his tenure as Military Governor of the old Gongola State.

In a trial widely dismissed as a political witch hunt, Jang was in 2018 arraigned in the Plateau State High Court of justice, Jos by the Economic and Financial Crimes Commission (EFCC) over allegations of fraud to the tune of 6.3 billion naira of Plateau State funds when he was Governor of the state.

While the citizenry having enjoyed a period of relative plenty and stability from May 2007 to May 2015 when Jang handed over the reins of power, contended the credibility of the trial, on 16 May 2018 he was remanded in Jos prison after his application for bail was declined by the court.

On 28 August 2018 Jang formally declared his interest to run for president of the Federal Republic of Nigeria at the Plateau State PDP secretariat.

Background

Jonah David Jang was born on 13 March 1944 in Du, Jos South Local Government Area of Plateau State. In 1965 he enlisted as an Air Force Officer Cadet at the Military Training School in Kaduna. He was given flight training at Uetersen in West Germany (1965–1966) and further training at the Nigerian Defence Academy, Kaduna. He was commissioned 2nd Lieutenant in 1969 and promoted to lieutenant in 1970. He attended a course on Supply Operations Training (Logistics) in Denver, Colorado, United States and was promoted to the rank of captain in 1972, major in 1975 and wing commander in 1978, serving in most of the Nigerian air formations during this period.

During the military regime of General Ibrahim Babangida he served as Military Governor of Benue State from August 1985 to August 1986, then as Military Governor of Gongola State from August 1986 to December 1987.

He voluntarily retired from the Nigeria Air Force in 1990.
Jonah Jang took a Bachelor of Divinity Degree at the Theological College of Northern Nigeria (2000–2002).
In 2007, he successfully contested the governorship election in Plateau State on the platform of the People's Democratic Party (PDP).
He ran successfully for reelection on 26 April 2011.

Legacy

In the waning days of his second tenure as chief executive of Plateau State, Jonah Jang sought for a successor to carry on with his legacy of infrastructural development and governmental reforms and his eyes fell on the astute Gyang Pwajok who was at the time completing the term of the late Senator Gyang Dantong in the Senate. Gyang Pwajok was young, intellectual and virile and was thought to be the most suitable for the job. He was a bridge between the old and young generations and was very representative of a proper transition from the gerontocracy to a new epoch in the political history of the state. However, certain villain and unpatriotic forces then spearheaded by Jang's predecessor and long time rival Joshua Dariye began to propagandise the population against a Berom back to back leadership of the state. They campaigned on the pretextual premise that having had two governors that both served 8 year tenures from the central senatorial district and the northern senatorial district respectively, since the advent of the Nigerian Fourth Republic it was only proper that a zoning of the gubernatorial office be instituted in the state thus the seat be zoned this time to the southern senatorial district of the state. And so they rallied all the minority tribes of the state and conspired an overthrow with little consideration for the personality and score card of the aspiring successor in the opposition. The Beroms (from which Gyang Pwajok came) and other well-meaning citizens aligned with good governance went to the polls and helped Pwajok poll enough numbers to clinch the vote. However, other forces at large were at play and managed to tip the scales in favour of Simon Lalong of the All Progressives Congress (APC) and he was announced the winner of the election. Simon Lalong was a long time protégé of Joshua Dariye and served as speaker of the Plateau State House of Assembly when Dariye was governor of the state.

See also
List of Governors of Plateau State

References

1944 births
Living people
Nigerian Christians
Nigerian Air Force officers
Governors of Benue State
Governors of Plateau State
Governors of Gongola State
Nigerian Defence Academy alumni
Members of the Senate (Nigeria)
Peoples Democratic Party (Nigeria) politicians
People from Plateau State
Nigerian politicians convicted of crimes